Givolim (lit. Stalks) is a religious moshav in southern Israel. Located near Netivot and covering 3,000 dunams, it falls under the jurisdiction of Sdot Negev Regional Council.

History
The village was established in 1952 by Jewish immigrants from Iraq and Kurdistan.

References

Iraqi-Jewish culture in Israel
Kurdish-Jewish culture in Israel
Moshavim
Religious Israeli communities
Populated places established in 1952
Populated places in Southern District (Israel)
1952 establishments in Israel